The Zastava M55, also designated 20/3-mm-M55, is a Yugoslavian/Serbian 20mm triple-barreled automatic anti-aircraft gun developed in 1955 and produced by Crvena Zastava (now Zastava Arms company) in Kragujevac, Serbia, for Yugoslav People's Army use and also for the export market. In addition to the basic towed model M55 A2, the variants M55 A3 B1, M55 A4 B1 and the BOV-3 SPAAG were also developed.

Development
In 1951, the Federal Secretariat of People's Defense (Serbo-Croatian: Savezni sekretarijat za narodnu odbranu – SSNO) purchased the manufacturing licence of the single-barrel Hispano-Suiza HS.804 20mm L/70 anti-aircraft autocannon mounted on the HSS.630-3 towed gun carriage. The HS.804 made by the Crvena Zastava Company entered production in 1955 as the Zastava 20/1mm M55 and the company's engineers began working in the development of a triple-barrelled version; the first prototype was completed and entered production in 1971.

Variants

Ground model M55 A2

The standard towed version of the M55 introduced in 1971, is intended for infantry use.

M55 A3 B1 
The M55 A3 B1 is an improved version of the M55 A2 introduced in 1978.

M55 A4 B1
The M55 A4 B1 was introduced in 1977–78, and is an M55 gun system mounted on the towed carriage of the Swiss GAI-D01 anti-aircraft gun. A new computer-controlled targeting system – the Galileo ballistic computer – was installed, which automatically monitors the gun after the target has been acquired. In addition, an engine of the same type as the M55 A3 B1 has been placed under the gunner's seat, which was moved from the lateral position found on the previous version in order to improve the weight distribution of the three barrels and prevent them from vibrating. When the cannon is put into position, the towed carriage is removed, and a small splinter-proof shield has been installed in front of the targeting device and the gunner.

M55 A4 M1 (BOV-3)

The M55 A4 M1 was first introduced in 1983, and consists on a modified A4 B1 system upgraded with the Galileo J171 ballistic computer, mounted on a turret installed in the top roof of a BOV armoured personnel carrier.

Combat history

Africa
The Zastava M55 A2 was employed extensively by the People's Armed Forces of Liberation of Angola (FAPLA) during the Angolan Civil War (1975–2002) and the later stages of the South African Border War (1966–1990), with a number of them being captured by the South African Defence Force during their military operations launched against SWAPO/PLAN guerrilla bases at southern Angola in the 1980s. Some of the captured guns were stripped from the triple mounts and re-mounted on the Casspir APCs employed by the Koevoet on their counter-insurgency operations in Angola and South West Africa whilst others were handed over to the Armed Forces of Liberation of Angola, the armed wing of UNITA.

The Zastava M55 was also employed by the People's Forces of Liberation of Mozambique (FPLM) during both the Mozambican Civil War (1977–1992) and the later phase of the Rhodesian Bush War, with a few guns falling into the hands of the Rhodesian Security Forces in the course of their covert cross-border raids on Zimbabwe African National Liberation Army (ZANLA) guerrilla training camps in Mozambique during the late 1970s.

Middle East
Lebanon received an unspecified number of Zastava M55 A2 autocannons sometime in the early 1970s from Yugoslavia, which were assigned to the air defense units of the Lebanese Army and the Lebanese Air Force. They were extensively employed during the Lebanese Civil War (1975–1990), with several guns falling into the hands of the various competing Christian and Muslim militias after the collapse of the Lebanese Armed Forces in January 1976. Main operators included the Army of Free Lebanon, Lebanese Arab Army, Al-Tanzim, Kataeb Regulatory Forces, Zgharta Liberation Army, the Tigers Militia, Arab Socialist Union, the Druze People's Liberation Army, the Al-Mourabitoun, and the Palestine Liberation Organization who mounted their Zastava M55 autocannons on technicals and M113 armored personnel carriers.

2020 Nagorno-Karabakh War
Azerbaijan's Ministry of Defence reported that it destroyed two Armenian Zastava M55s 9–10 October 2020 as part of the 2020 Nagorno-Karabakh war.

Operators
 Armenian Armed Forces
 Angolan Armed Forces
 Armed Forces of Bosnia and Herzegovina
 Armed Forces of the Democratic Republic of the Congo
 Army of the Republic of North Macedonia
 Croatian Army
 Cyprus National Guard
 Guatemalan Armed Forces
 Indonesian Air Force Paskhas corps, 55 M55 A2 units. still in limited service.
 Mozambique Defence Armed Forces
 Salvadoran Army
 Serbian Army
 Slovenian Armed Forces
 Tunisian Army

Former operators
 Armed Forces of Liberation of Angola (UNITA) – Handed over by South Africa or captured from FAPLA.
 Lebanese Armed Forces – Retired (now used for training purposes only).
 Rhodesian Security Forces – Captured from FPLM or ZANLA.
 Palestine Liberation Organization – Captured from the Lebanese Armed Forces.
 South African Defence Force – Captured from FAPLA.
 Syrian Armed Forces
 Yugoslav People's Army and Territorial Defense – passed on to successor states.

See also
Hispano-Suiza HS.404
Hispano-Suiza HS.820
Oerlikon 20 mm cannon
Zastava Arms
ZPU
ZU-23-2

Notes

References

 Al J. Venter, War in Angola (1030), Concord Publications, Hong Kong 1992. 
 Christopher F. Foss, Jane's Tank & Combat Vehicle recognition guide, HarperCollins Publishers, London 2002. 
 Helmoed-Romer Heitman & Paul Hannon, Modern African Wars (3): South-West Africa, Men-at-arms series 242, Osprey Publishing Ltd, London 1991.  
 Samer Kassis, 30 Years of Military Vehicles in Lebanon, Beirut: Elite Group, 2003. 
 Samer Kassis, Véhicules Militaires au Liban/Military Vehicles in Lebanon 1975-1981, Trebia Publishing, Chyah 2012. 
 Samer Kassis, Invasion of Lebanon 1982, Abteilung 502, 2019.  – 
 Leigh Neville, Technicals: Non-Standard Tactical Vehicles from the Great Toyota War to modern Special Forces, New Vanguard series 257, Osprey Publishing Ltd, Oxford 2018. 
 Miroslav Jandrić, Seventh Decade of the Military Technical Institute (1948. – 2013.), Scientific Technical Review, 2013, Vol. 63, No. 2, pp. 5–25. UDK: 355.014:623.4, COSATI: 15–05, 19–06, 01-03 – 
 Moustafa El-Assad, Civil Wars Volume 1: The Gun Trucks, Blue Steel books, Sidon 2008. 
 Paul Jureidini, R. D. McLaurin, and James Price, Military operations in selected Lebanese built-up areas, 1975-1978, Aberdeen, MD: U.S. Army Human Engineering Laboratory, Aberdeen Proving Ground, Technical Memorandum 11–79, June 1979.
Zachary Sex & Bassel Abi-Chahine, Modern Conflicts 2 – The Lebanese Civil War, From 1975 to 1991 and Beyond, Modern Conflicts Profile Guide Volume II, AK Interactive, 2021. ISBN 8435568306073

External links
Official website of Zastava Arms
20/3 mm M55 A2 (Serbia), Towed anti-aircraft guns
20/3 mm M55 A3 B1 (Serbia), Towed anti-aircraft guns
20/3 mm M55 A4 B1 (Serbia), Towed anti-aircraft guns

Zastava Arms
Artillery of Yugoslavia
Anti-aircraft weapons of Serbia
Serbian design